Hoffmeier is a surname of German origin, being a variant of the surname Hofmeyer. Notable people with the surname include:

Frederikke Hoffmeier (born 1989), better known as Puce Mary, Danish experimental musician, composer, and sound artist
James K. Hoffmeier (born 1951), American scholar, archaeologist, and Egyptologist
Marcel Hoffmeier (born 1999), German footballer

See also
Hofmeier
Hoffmeyer